Joyland is an unincorporated community in Durham County, North Carolina, United States, on North Carolina Highway 98, east of its junction with U.S. Route 70. It has been annexed by Durham.

External links
 Joyland at the U.S. Geographic Names Information System

Unincorporated communities in Durham County, North Carolina
Research Triangle
Annexed places in North Carolina
Unincorporated communities in North Carolina